Ardilla is an unincorporated community in Houston County, Alabama, United States. Ardilla is located along Alabama State Route 53, 1 mile southeast of Ross Clark Circle in Dothan.

History
Ardilla was named in honor of the wife of the community's first postmaster, Henry Wood. A post office operated under the name Ardilla from 1898 to 1918.

The Ardilla soil series is named for the community.

Demographics
According to the returns from 1850-2010 for Alabama, it has never reported a population figure separately on the U.S. Census.

References

Unincorporated communities in Houston County, Alabama
Unincorporated communities in Alabama